48 Squadron or 48th Squadron may refer to:

No. 48 Squadron (Finland)
No. 48 Squadron IAF, India
No. 48 Squadron RAF, United Kingdom

United States
48th Airlift Squadron
48th Bombardment Squadron
48th Intelligence Squadron
48th Flying Training Squadron
48th Rescue Squadron
48th Air Transport Squadron
Marine Tactical Air Command Squadron 48
Marine Wing Communications Squadron 48
VP-48
VP-48 (1946-91)